Smolnik ( or ) is a dispersed settlement in the hills northwest of Polhov Gradec in the Municipality of Dobrova–Polhov Gradec in the Upper Carniola region of Slovenia.

Name
Smolnik was first mentioned in written records in 1498 as Smollnick, Smulnick, and Smolnick. The name is derived from the Slovene word smola 'resin' and refers to a place where resin was gathered.

References

External links

Smolnik on Geopedia

Populated places in the Municipality of Dobrova-Polhov Gradec